The 1994 AC Delco 500 was the 29th stock car race of the 1994 NASCAR Winston Cup Series season and the 20th iteration of the event. The race was held on Sunday, October 23, 1994, in Rockingham, North Carolina, at North Carolina Speedway, a  permanent high-banked racetrack. The race took the scheduled 492 laps to complete. In the final laps of the race, Richard Childress Racing driver Dale Earnhardt would manage to defend against Precision Products Racing driver Rick Mast to take his 63rd career NASCAR Winston Cup Series victory and his fourth and final victory of the season. To fill out the top three, the aforementioned Rick Mast and Wood Brothers Racing driver Morgan Shepherd would finish second and third, respectively.

With the victory, Earnhardt would manage to mathematically clinch and win a record-tying seventh NASCAR Winston Cup Series championship, which at the time was an achievement only achieved by Richard Petty. Earnhardt had only needed to gain 50 points on second-place driver in the driver's standings, Rusty Wallace. With Earnhardt's win and an early engine issue from Wallace, Earnhardt had managed to gain 127 points on Wallace, thus clinching the championship. The feat would not be matched until 2016, when Jimmie Johnson managed to win his seventh championship at the 2016 Ford EcoBoost 400.

Background 

North Carolina Speedway was opened as a flat, one-mile oval on October 31, 1965. In 1969, the track was extensively reconfigured to a high-banked, D-shaped oval just over one mile in length. In 1997, North Carolina Motor Speedway merged with Penske Motorsports, and was renamed North Carolina Speedway. Shortly thereafter, the infield was reconfigured, and competition on the infield road course, mostly by the SCCA, was discontinued. Currently, the track is home to the Fast Track High Performance Driving School.

Entry list 

 (R) denotes rookie driver.

Qualifying 
Qualifying was originally scheduled to be split into two rounds. The first round was scheduled to be held on Thursday, October 20, at 3:00 PM EST.  However, after 35 drivers had taken times for qualifying, first-round qualifying was rained out and postponed until Friday, October 21, at 2:00 PM EST. As a result of the rain delay, qualifying was decided to be combined into only one round. For this specific race, positions 1-40 would be decided on time, and depending on who needed it, a select amount of positions were given to cars who had not otherwise qualified but were high enough in owner's points; up to two provisionals were given. If needed, a past champion who did not qualify on either time or provisionals could use a champion's provisional, adding one more spot to the field.

Three drivers would fail to qualify.

Full qualifying results

Race results

Standings after the race 

Drivers' Championship standings

Note: Only the first 10 positions are included for the driver standings.

References 

1994 NASCAR Winston Cup Series
NASCAR races at Rockingham Speedway
October 1994 sports events in the United States
1994 in sports in North Carolina